Darren Victor Bett (born 1968 in Scunthorpe, Lincolnshire) is an English weather forecaster for the BBC, broadcasting on television and radio. Bett is a main weather presenter on BBC Radio 5 Live and also appears on the BBC News Channel, BBC World News, BBC One and BBC Radio 4.

Early life
As well as Scunthorpe, Bett lived in Kirton in Lindsey.

He attended the Huntcliff School, Kirton in Lindsey, where he gave a talk on 21 October 1993.
He did his A levels in Maths, Physics and Chemistry at John Leggott College, in the west of Scunthorpe. He studied at the University of East Anglia in Norwich, receiving a degree in environmental science in 1989.

Career
In September 1989, he joined the Met Office as a weather forecaster. He worked at Glasgow and Bracknell, then moved to the Leeds Weather Centre in 1992. From 1994, he was one of the main weather presenters for the local regional news programmes Calendar and Look North. He moved to London to work for the BBC News Channel (then called BBC News 24) in November 1997, to be replaced in Leeds by Paul Hudson.

Personal life
Bett is a keen supporter of Liverpool Football Club.

References

External links
 BBC biography
 
 BBC Weather forecast from 1 August 1999 presented by Darren Bett

1968 births
Living people
Alumni of the University of East Anglia
BBC weather forecasters
BBC World News
People from the Borough of North Lincolnshire